Proteuxoa callimera is a moth of the family Noctuidae. It is found in South Australia and Western Australia.

Larvae have been recorded feeding on Chenopodiaceae and possibly Poaceae species under the cover of sand in white sand dunes.

External links
Australian Faunal Directory

Callimera
Moths of Australia
Moths described in 1897